Charles Justin Radley (16 April 1925 – 8 October 1977) was a Canadian football player who played for the Saskatchewan Roughriders. He played junior football in Montreal. Radley died in Regina, Saskatchewan on 8 October 1977, at the age of 52.

References

1925 births
1977 deaths
Anglophone Quebec people
Players of Canadian football from Quebec
Saskatchewan Roughriders players
Canadian football people from Montreal